"Many Moons" is a 2008 song by American singer Janelle Monáe, included on the Metropolis: Suite I (The Chase) album. It was number 47 on Rolling Stones list of the 100 Best Songs of 2008. The song was also nominated for Best Urban/Alternative Performance at the 51st Grammy Awards. The song's opening section, which involves a refrain of "voodoo," borrows both musically and lyrically from the "Pinball Number Count" song from Sesame Street, which was performed by The Pointer Sisters.

Music video
The video, which Monáe promoted as a short film, takes place at the Annual Android Auction in the fictional city of Metropolis. During the auction, Monae's alter-ego Cindi Mayweather performs for the crowd, while the other androids walk down the catwalk, and are being bought off by the wealthiest of Metropolis, such as technology moguls, city officials, religious authorities, and crime lords, while each android costing billions of British Pounds, as were being used in the short film. She eventually performs so feverishly that she shorts out, and is taken away by Lady Maestra, Master of the ShowDroids (another alter-ego). The video was directed by Alan Ferguson.

Critical reception
The song received a positive critical reception. Random JPop wrote "'Many Moons' follows in the footsteps of 'Violet Stars Happy Hunting' by marrying 60's swing with hip-hop undertones ... This sounds very much like an OutKast song - with an unconventional beat that seems hard to catch in places, but sticks a couple of minutes in. The song oozes originality and Janelle's operatic runs are hot. So many different genres and styles get fused into this song, yet they all unify so well."

References

External links
Janelle Monáe's official website

2008 singles
Janelle Monáe songs
2008 songs
Songs written by Janelle Monáe
Bad Boy Records singles